Linda Patricia Mary Dunford ( Robson; born 13 March 1958) is an English actress and television presenter. She is best known for playing Tracey Stubbs in the sitcom Birds of a Feather (1989–1998, 2014–2020) and her appearances as a weekly panellist on the ITV series Loose Women (2012–2018, 2020–present).

As a founder student of Anna Scher's Theatre School, Robson had a significant number of appearances on screen as a child actor.

Early life
Robson was born in Islington, London to an English father and an Irish mother. She has two sisters. Educated at Ecclesbourne Primary School, where Anna Scher started her Theatre School in 1968 with Robson and Pauline Quirke being amongst the founding students. Later she attended the Shelburne Secondary School for Girls, now amalgamated into Highbury Fields School, and The Young Actors Theatre, all in Islington.

Career

Early career
Robson first appeared on screen in the 1970 film Junket 89 produced by Children's Film Foundation alongside other actors from The Anna Scher Children's Theatre in Islington, including Pauline Quirke.
Robson had a minor role as Barbara, a young girl amidst a group of roaming teenagers, in the second series of the original BBC Survivors drama aired in 1976.
She appeared in Pauline's Quirkes (her first regular appearance with Pauline Quirke), the drama series The Crezz, the short lived sitcom L for Lester (in 1982) and the IRA drama Harry's Game. Robson played Maggie Moon in Shine on Harvey Moon, a British comedy drama television series made by Central Television for ITV from 8 January 1982 to 23 August 1985 and briefly revived in 1995 by Meridian.

Birds of a Feather

Robson played Tracey Stubbs in the BBC sitcom Birds of a Feather from 1989 to 1998, starring with Pauline Quirke and Lesley Joseph.

Television
Robson subsequently appeared in programmes such as The Bill and Crossroads. Following the success of Birds of a Feather, she appeared again with Pauline Quirke in Jobs for the Girls. She appeared with Jenny Eclair and Dillie Keane in the original cast of Grumpy Old Women Live, a spin-off from the television series Grumpy Old Women, written by Jenny Eclair and Judith Holder. On 9 August 2007, she narrated a show for ITV, called Britain's Youngest Brides. In July 2008, Robson entered Celebrity MasterChef and went out in the first round. 

In July 2010, Robson made a guest appearance in BBC drama series Casualty, playing the mother of a young man with bipolar disorder. Robson was the first celebrity to arrive in Australia ahead of the 2012 series of I'm a Celebrity...Get Me Out of Here!, but was voted out on the 13th day in the camp on 23 November 2012, finishing in 9th place.

Loose Women
Robson made her debut as a guest panellist on Loose Women on 19 August 2003, appearing alongside Kaye Adams, Carol McGiffin & Terri Dwyer. Robson returned to the show as a guest panellist on 2 December 2010, before returning as an occasional panellist from 11 November 2011. Regular panellist Jenny Eclair left the show in June 2012, meaning Robson became a regular panellist on 19 June 2012, replacing Eclair. As of 2016 Robson appears on Loose Women 1 or 2 times a week. Robson made 3 appearances during Series 16, 28 appearances in Series 17, 44 appearances in Series 18, 35 appearances in Series 19, 57 appearances in Series 20, 34 appearances in series 21, 49 appearances in series 22 and for Series 23 Linda made 21 appearances as of December 2018. Robson did not return after Christmas and was replaced by Brenda Edwards.
After a period of absence due to sickness, Linda returned to the panel from 17 January 2020.

Birds of a Feather revival

In 2013, it was announced that Birds of a Feather was to return for a tenth series, this time airing on the ITV network. The first episode aired on 2 January 2014 to an audience of over 8 million. After a successful tenth series, it was announced in 2014 that Birds of a Feather would return for an eleventh series, which began on 26 December 2014. In March 2015, it was announced that ITV had commissioned a third revived series (twelfth overall) which began airing in January 2016. The next series has been ordered and plans were mad to air in 2017. However filming has yet begun for a full series. Confusion occurred in February 2019 when Nigel Lythgoe seemed to suggest the series had ended. However an ITV representative later confirmed this was false as reported on digital Spy. ITV have confirmed a new series will air and the hope was to start recording this year to mark 30 years of the sitcom. However this has since been put on hold due to Lesley Joseph's busy schedule. A 2020 special has been filmed for this Christmas but without Pauline Quirke who has retired from acting to put efforts in to other works.

Radio
Robson is an occasional guest presenter for BBC London 94.9. In November 2012, she played the part of Lisa, the hypochondriac mother of Luke (Daniel Mays) in Alexander Kirk's play Told You I Was Ill, episode two in the series Living with Mother on BBC Radio 4.

Other work
In November 2014, Robson was a part of Gareth Malone's 'All Star Choir', who released a cover version of Wake Me Up to raise money for the BBC's Children in Need. The single reached No.1 on the Official UK Singles Chart.

In 2011, Robson appeared in the film Anuvahood as K's mum Pauline. In 2012, Robson took part in the twelfth series of I'm a Celebrity...Get Me Out of Here!, coming in 9th place. On 12 November 2016 Robson appeared on Tipping Point Lucky Stars on ITV.

In 2022, Robson appeared on the seventh series of Celebrity Coach Trip alongside her Birds of a Feather co-star Lesley Joseph.

Personal life
Robson has lived in Islington, London, all her life. She is married with three children. Her first child Lauren was born to her then longtime partner Tony Tyler, her other children were fathered by her husband Mark, whom she married in 1990.

Robson's father was a chain-smoker, who died of lung cancer when he was 57. Her mother also died of cancer in August 2012. In October 2013, Robson voiced an interactive video campaign for the British Lung Foundation aiming to ban smoking in cars with children on board in the United Kingdom, in memory of her father.

Robson is a fan of Boris Johnson and revealed on Loose Women that she used to see and chat with him when he lived in Islington. When it was announced that he had resigned as Prime Minister she said she was sad.

One of Robson's three children is singer songwriter Louis Dunford.

Stage and screen credits

Filmography

Theatre

References

External links

Linda Robson at the British Film Institute

1958 births
Living people
English film actresses
English radio actresses
English stage actresses
English television actresses
English people of Irish descent
Actresses from London
People with obsessive–compulsive disorder
People from Islington (district)
Alumni of the Anna Scher Theatre School
20th-century English actresses
21st-century English actresses
I'm a Celebrity...Get Me Out of Here! (British TV series) participants